Tahsil Bhadra railway station is a railway station in Hanumangarh district, Rajasthan. Its code is TSD. It serves Tahsil Bhadra city. The station consists of 3 platforms. Passenger, Express, and Superfast trains halt here.

Trains

The following trains halt at Tahsil Bhadra railway station in both directions:

 Bikaner–Bilaspur Antyodaya Express

References

Railway stations in Hanumangarh district
Bikaner railway division